Tripod are an Australian musical comedy trio founded by Scod (Scott Edgar), Yon (Simon Hall) and Gatesy (Steven Gates) in 1996. They provide original songs and harmonies, strung together by comic banter.

History

Live shows
Tripod began as buskers in Melbourne malls, performing a far-fetched prop act of which no record exists. They emerged as a musical act from the thriving Melbourne live music pub scene of the mid nineties, supporting popular local cover bands in such places as the Station Hotel, The Esplanade, the Central Club, the New Orleans Tavern and the Ritz, St Kilda. They were very much a cover band at first, performing three part harmony versions on hits by the likes of Elvis Costello, Bowie, the Beach Boys and Queen. They garnered a local following via regular residencies at the Commercial Hotel, Yarraville, just after it stopped being a biker bar.

They soon became regulars at the Prince Patrick Hotel in Collingwood, a Melbourne comedy venue, where they honed their skills in residencies and appearances from 1998 through to its demise in 2003.

Tripod are stalwarts of their home festival, the Melbourne International Comedy Festival, where they often performed since 1997, when they took their pub act and jammed it into a one-hour festival format at St Martins Youth Arts Centre, in a show entitled Welcome to My Wonderwall. They have appeared on music festival stages including the Falls Festival, the Port Fairy Folk Festival, the Queenscliff Music Festival and the Woodford Folk Festival.

Tripod have appeared internationally, including the Montreal Just For Laughs festival and the Upright Citizens Brigade theatre in New York and Los Angeles. They have played the Edinburgh Fringe numerous times.

They have also toured the Australian rural countryside including long stints with the MICF Roadshow.

Tripod alternate the form of their shows between the song-and-sketch cabaret gig format (such as Self Saucing and Men of Substance) and narrative musicals. Their first "story" show was Tripod Tells the Tale of the Adventures of Tosswinkle the Pirate (not very well), which premiered at the MICF before touring nationally.

Their narrative show, Lady Robots, was first previewed at the 2002 Adelaide Fringe Festival before it was performed at the MICF later that year. The show was a musical comedy telling the story of three men who are hurled into space where they come across a planet populated only by Lady Robots. Tripod performed a re-jigged version of the show, Lady Robots v1.1 at the Athenaeum Theatre at the Melbourne International Comedy Festival in 2005, before a national tour culminating in a hit season at the Sydney Opera House. No recordings are known to exist.

On 30 January 2010, Tripod held the world premiere of their comedic musical Tripod versus the Dragon at the Massachusetts Museum of Contemporary Art in North Adams, Massachusetts, United States. Elana Stone co-starred in the production in the role of "The Dungeon Master"/"Dragon" after Megan Washington, who had been co-writing songs for the production, declined the role due to scheduling conflicts. The production is based on the Dungeons and Dragons role-playing game. Tripod went on to perform this show at the Adelaide Fringe Festival, Melbourne International Comedy Festival, the Sydney Opera House, and the Edinburgh Fringe Festival in 2010, as well as subsequent seasons in Perth, Brisbane, regional Victoria and the Przeglad Piosenki Aktorskiej festival in Wroclaw, Poland.

In January 2013, Tripod joined forces with Australian performer Eddie Perfect to create Perfect Tripod, a show of classic Australian songs arranged in four-part harmony, inspired by their cover of Meet Me in the Middle of the Air performed on The Sideshow on 13 October 2007. Perfect Tripod toured concert halls throughout the nation and have collaborated with such Australian pop music greats as Gotye and Missy Higgins.

In October 2014, Tripod performed live at the international gaming convention, PAX (Penny Arcade Expo), in Melbourne at the Melbourne Convention and Exhibition Centre. There they performed a short preview of This Gaming Life, an original collaboration between Tripod, Grammy nominated composer Austin Wintory and the Melbourne Symphony Orchestra.

In 2015 This Gaming Life played to rapturous houses at Hamer Hall, Victorian Arts Centre, with a 55 piece orchestra conducted and arranged by Wintory. The show was a full scale two-act orchestral love letter to the culture and relationships of passionate video gamers, and has been described as the "Stand By Me of the gamer generation."

TV
The band got their first break appearing on Hey Hey It's Saturday's "Red Faces" contest, where they performed a parodic medley of Oasis hits that demonstrated similarities between the songs.

Their first regular TV appearances were on In Melbourne Tonight (IMT) with Frankie J Holden. Throughout the 1990s and early 2000s they also showed up regularly on such live TV stalwarts as Good Morning Australia with Bert Newton, Denise with Denise Drysdale and popular Saturday morning live rock show Recovery.

Tripod were a feature act in Network Ten's 2003/2004 sketch comedy television show skitHOUSE, writing and performing sketches and songs as part of the core cast.

They performed on Rove/Rove Live in 1999, 2003, and 2004, and were guest programmers of Rage in 2004.

Tripod were also core cast performers on the 2007 ABC weekly variety program The Sideshow.

The group made frequent musical appearances on Network Ten's Good News Week from 2009 to 2011, and have appeared on various ABC1 programs, including Spicks and Specks (May 2011), and Adam Hills Tonight (May 2013).

They have appeared yearly for almost two decades on the Oxfam Melbourne International Comedy Festival Gala.

Radio
Tripod have appeared as guests throughout their career on popular Australian radio stations.

Their Song-in-an-Hour Challenge (2001–2004) was a popular segment on Triple J's drive-time show with Merrick and Rosso, and later on the Triple J Breakfast show with Wil Anderson and Adam Spencer. In it they had one hour to write and arrange a coherent song based on incoherent listener suggestions and then perform said song to an eager national audience. Tripod often refer to this experience as their songwriting boot camp.

Two CDs containing some of the finest examples of these sessions have been released, each also including recordings taken from live Song-In-An-Hour challenges featured in Tripod's Pod August Nights concerts. In late 2005, they moved to Fox FM where they could be heard on Peter Helliar's weekly Friday morning show, Pete's Show.

Podcast 
On December 24, 2015 Tripod along with host Andrew Pogson started a regular podcast titled Perfectly Good Podcast. Initially started to promote their upcoming 101 Tripod Hits tour, the ongoing series shifted its focus covering any number of topic including current themes or stories from Tripod's 20+ years together. Each podcast centers around a theme in which host Andrew Pogson attempts to keep the members of Tripod to. Tripod also play live or play recordings of their songs which loosely relate to the episode's theme.

Suggested in Episode 27, and making its first appearance in Episode 28 with Andrew Pogson's submission Tripod asked listeners to submit alternate lyrics for the song Aquaman, and Tripod then played each submission on varies episodes.

Recordings 
Tripod's very first record Box Set was released in 1997. It was funded by their winnings from live TV segment Red Faces on Hey Hey It's Saturday

Their album Middleborough Rd, made up of studio recordings of songs they wrote for the sketch TV series SkitHouse, won the ARIA Award for Best Comedy Release at the ARIA Music Awards of 2005.

Tripod toured with the show Tripod are Self Saucing in 2004, and again at the 2006 MICF. They recorded a live album of the show in April 2006 entitled Songs from Self Saucing, recorded and mixed by regular collaborator Nao Anzai, which was nominated for Best Comedy Release at the 2007 ARIA awards.

Tripod's first DVD was also released in 2006: a live recording of their 2005 show "POD August Nights". The DVD includes numerous special features including a music video for their song "Gonna Make You Happy Tonight" from their 2004 album, Middleborough Rd.

Tripod's 2001 show, Tripod tells the tale of the Adventures of Tosswinkle the Pirate (Not Very Well) was also released on DVD in 2006, following the original 2001 VHS release.

In 2009, Tripod released a DVD of a live performance at the Woodford Folk Festival. This DVD featured never-before-seen bonus footage consisting of a bootleg recording of their 2007 show How to Train an Attack Dog from Scratch, a show whose narrative was loosely based around an examination of the fictional history of musical comedy.

Tripod released a Christmas album in 2009, from their Christmas shows, entitled For the Love of God. A toured nationally with the songs, performing in the Sydney Opera House that year.

They released a CD of songs from Tripod versus the Dragon, including extended versions of the songs from an early version of the show, as well as a DVD with numerous easter eggs and special features on 2 March 2011.

Men of Substance, their first full scale studio project since For the Love of God, was produced by longtime friend and collaborator John Castle (Megan Washington, Vance Joy, the Bamboos)

Composition 
Tripod composed the theme song for SBS One's Australian television comedy history show ADbc in 2009.

Albums

Members
Scott "Scod" Edgar – vocals, guitar, keyboard (1996–present)
Steven "Gatesy" Gates – vocals, guitar (1996–present)
Simon "Yon" Hall – vocals, trumpet, kazoo, occasional percussion (1996–present)

Awards

ARIA Music Awards
The ARIA Music Awards is an annual awards ceremony that recognises excellence, innovation, and achievement across all genres of Australian music. Tripod has won one award from six nominations, all in the category of ARIA Award for Best Comedy Release.

|-
| 2003
| About an Hour of Song in an Hour
| rowspan="6"| Best Comedy Release
| 
|-
| rowspan="2"| 2004
| About an Hour of Song in an Hour...Again
| 
|-
| Live – Fegh Maha
| 
|-
| 2005
| Middleborough Rd
| 
|-
| 2007
| Songs from Self Saucing
| 
|-
| 2009
| For the Love of God!
| 
|-

Other Awards
 2003 Australian Comedy Awards: People's Choice Award; Award for Outstanding Comedy Recording (Songs in an Hour)
 2007 Edinburgh Spirit of the Fringe award.
 2008 Green Room Award: Best Original Songs in a Cabaret Performance (How to Train an Attack Dog from Scratch).
 2015 ASTRA Award: Most Outstanding Children's Program (Monster Beach)

References

External links
 Official website

Australian comedy musical groups
Australian radio comedy
ARIA Award winners
Musical groups established in 1997
Australian musical trios
Australian rock music groups
Musical groups from Melbourne